Jim Karleskint (born October 17, 1947) is an American politician. He served as a Republican member for the 42nd district in the Kansas House of Representatives from 2017 to 2020.

References

1947 births
Living people
Republican Party members of the Kansas House of Representatives
21st-century American politicians